The Digital Signature Standard (DSS) is a Federal Information Processing Standard specifying a suite of algorithms that can be used to generate digital signatures established by the U.S. National Institute of Standards and Technology (NIST) in 1994. Four revisions to the initial specification have been released: FIPS  in 1996, FIPS  in 2000, FIPS  in 2009, and FIPS  in 2013.

It defines the Digital Signature Algorithm, contains a definition of RSA signatures based on the definitions contained within PKCS #1 version 2.1 and in American National Standard X9.31 with some additional requirements, and contains a definition of the Elliptic Curve Digital Signature Algorithm based on the definition provided by American National Standard X9.62 with some additional requirements and some recommended elliptic curves. It also approves the use of all three algorithms.

References 

 
Digital signature schemes